Gautam Radhakrishna Desiraju is an Indian structural chemist, educationist and a professor of Chemistry at the Indian Institute of Science. He has contributed substantially to the themes of crystal engineering and weak hydrogen bonding. He has authored books on these subjects in 1989 and 1999. He has co-authored a textbook in crystal engineering (2011). He is one of the most highly cited Indian scientists (h index = 102) and has been recognised by awards such as the Alexander von Humboldt Forschungspreis 2000, the ISA Medal for Science 2018 of the University of Bologna, the van der Waals Prize 2023 of ICNI Strasbourg, and the TWAS Prize in Chemistry 2000. He served as President of the International Union of Crystallography for the triennium 2011–2014. He has been conferred the first 'Arivé Guru' award (2022) of Karnatak University, Dharwad. He is the author of a book on the Constitution of India and governance structures (2022) entitled "Bharat: India 2.0". In this book he argues that while India has a constitution for a nation state, it is actually a civilisational state that is 5000 years old.

Biography
Gautam Desiraju was born 21 August 1952 in Madras, India. He had his schooling in Cathedral and John Connon Boys School in Bombay and obtained his BSc (1972) from St. Xavier's College, Bombay. He obtained his PhD (1976) from University of Illinois at Urbana-Champaign where he worked under the supervision of David Y. Curtin and Iain C. Paul.  He worked between 1976 and 1978 in the Research Laboratories of Eastman Kodak Company in Rochester, NY. From 1978 to 1979 he was a research fellow in the Indian Institute of Science, Bangalore. He joined the University of Hyderabad in 1979 as a lecturer and was promoted as reader in 1984 and professor in 1990. He spent a year (1988–1989) in the CR&D department of DuPont in Wilmington as a visiting scientist. After 30 years in the University of Hyderabad, he joined the Indian Institute of Science in Bangalore in 2009. He is a member of the editorial advisory boards of Angewandte Chemie, Chemical Communications and the Journal of the American Chemical Society.  He is a past president of the International Union of Crystallography during 2011–2014. He was the chair of the first Gordon Research Conference in Crystal Engineering, 2010 and is now a member of the Vice Chancellor's Strategic Advisory Council of the University of Petroleum & Energy Studies (UPES) Dehradun, as well as a member of the Academic Council of Rishihood University Sonepat. He is a recipient of an honorary doctorate degree of the Universidad Nacional de Córdoba, Argentina, the Rayalaseema University, Kurnool and of the Gulbarga University, Kalaburagi. He organized, in August 2017, the 24th Congress and General Assembly of the International Union of Crystallography  in Hyderabad. He was awarded the Acharya P. C. Ray Medal (2015) of the University of Calcutta for innovation in science and technology, the ISA Medal (2018) for Science of the University of Bologna and the van der Waals Prize (2023) by ICNI, Strasbourg.

Major research contributions

Desiraju's contribution to the subject of crystal engineering has focus on the concept of the supramolecular synthon, which is a small sub-structural unit that is an adequate enough representation of the entire crystal structure of a molecular solid. The major problem in crystal engineering is that the prediction of a crystal structure from a molecular structure is very difficult and not easily derivable from functional groups. Identification of supramolecular synthons simplifies this otherwise intractable problem. The supramolecular synthon concept is now widely used by crystal engineers in the design of molecular crystals and pharmaceutical co-crystals, which are important from scientific and commercial viewpoints. Crystal engineering is effectively like supramolecular synthesis in the solid state, and there is a direct analogy between the supramolecular synthon of Desiraju and the molecular synthon that was proposed for organic synthesis by E. J. Corey.

Desiraju's second area of contribution focuses on weakly activated groups like the C-H group can act as donors of hydrogen bonds in molecular and biomolecular systems. These weak hydrogen bonds had been discussed sporadically since the 1930s, but it was only after the 1980s that the idea of a weakly activated group forming hydrogen bonds gained acceptance in the chemical community. Desiraju was among the few structural chemists who argued in those early days that the C-H...O and other weak interactions have a hydrogen bond character.

Desiraju has authored around 479 research papers and a total of 512 publications as given in the Web of Science. In addition to the three books on crystal engineering and hydrogen bonding, he has edited three multi-author books on these topics in structural chemistry. He has guided the PhD work of nearly 40 students over the past 43 years.

General writing and new book Bharat: India 2.0
Desiraju has authored several commentaries on science, the evolution of chemistry as a subject, emergence and complexity, and research habits and practices in various cultures. He has also written articles about the state of science education and research in India,, and about the current status of chemistry research in India, where he has identified problems and suggested solutions in situations that are, in part, expected in a country that is rooted in the traditional but yet aspires for the contemporary.

Desiraju strongly believes that if a sense of "Indian-ness" is inculcated in Indian students and young scientists, a modern
competitive spirit and adherence to professionalism will enter the education and research area of India automatically. He feels that this essential spirit is now largely lacking and that it is the chief cause of the present sluggishness in our R&D sectors. It is in this spirit that he has written his most recent book "Bharat: India 2.0" which describes India as a civilisational state where the concept of dharma needs to be explicitly invoked in the constitution and where the full diversity of the country is optimally showcased. This book has been widely acclaimed by many.

More is given in his web page at desiraju.in

ISI Ratings
His has written four books. His first (single author) book on crystal engineering (1989) has around 4000 cites. His second book (co-authored with Thomas Steiner in 1999) on the weak hydrogen bond has around 7500 cites. His third book is a textbook on crystal engineering (2010) and is co-authored with J. J. Vittal and A. Ramanan. His 1995 review in Angewandte Chemie has been cited more than 5000 times and is the paper with the second largest number of citations from India. Seven of his 479 publications have been cited 1000 or more times, 14 over 500, 41 over 200, and 81 over 100. As of July 2022, he has an h-index of 102 in Web of Science and this makes him the second most highly cited scientist in India, and the one with the highest m-index. His fourth book Bharat: India 2.0 (2022), the first non-scientific one, is referred to above.

References and notes

External links

 Desiraju Homepage

1952 births
University of Illinois Urbana-Champaign alumni
Academic staff of the Indian Institute of Science
Indian crystallographers
TWAS laureates
Indian chemists
Indian scientists
Living people
Telugu people